Deac is a surname. Notable people with the surname include:

Augustin Deac (1928–2004), Romanian author
Bogdan-Daniel Deac (born 2001), Romanian chess grandmaster
Ciprian Deac (born 1986), Romanian footballer
Gabriel Deac (born 1995), Romanian footballer
Ioan Pap-Deac (born 1969), Romanian footballer

Romanian-language surnames